The Lent Bumps 1998 were a series of rowing races held at Cambridge University from Tuesday 24 until Saturday 28 February 1998. The event was run as a bumps race and is one of a series of Lent Bumps which have been held annually in late-February or early March since 1887. See Lent Bumps for the format of the races. In 1998, a total of 121 crews took part (69 men's crews and 52 women's crews), with around 1000 participants in total. Several thousand spectators came to watch, particularly on the Saturday.

Due to pressures from the university authorities, the 1998 Lent Bumps was run over 5 days, rather than 4 days, which was the norm since the end of World War II. In the new format, each division had one day off racing, with the 1st divisions missing the first day, 2nd divisions missing the second day etc., which reduced the amount of time needed to complete the racing each day and thus reduce the need for many students to miss lectures. Every division raced on the last day, but as this was a Saturday with fewer lectures held in the university, this wasn't as big a problem. This format, introduced in 1998, has been used at every Lent Bumps since.

Head of the River crews 
 First and Third Trinity men bumped Downing to take their first headship of the Lent Bumps since 1971.

 Emmanuel women rowed-over in 1st position, achieving the headship for the 2nd consecutive year and 8th time since 1988.

Highest 2nd VIIIs 
 The highest men's 2nd VIII for the 2nd consecutive year was Lady Margaret II.

 The highest women's 2nd VIII at the end of the week was Lady Margaret II, who bumped Jesus II on the 2nd day.

Links to races in other years

Bumps Charts 
Below are the bumps charts for all four men's and all 3 women's divisions, with the men's event on the left and women's event on the right. The bumps chart represents the progress of every crew over all four days of the racing. To follow the progress of any particular crew, simply find the crew's name on the left side of the chart and follow the line to the end-of-the-week finishing position on the right of the chart.

Lent Bumps results
1998 in English sport
1998 in rowing
February 1998 sports events in the United Kingdom